Wildflower is a Philippine revenge drama television series starring Maja Salvador, together with an ensemble cast. The series premiered on ABS-CBN's Primetime Bida evening block and worldwide on The Filipino Channel on February 13, 2017, to February 9, 2018.

The story revolves around Lily Cruz, a girl whose parents were murdered by the Ardiente family. She vows revenge against the family, and plots several schemes in orchestrating the downfall of the Ardiente family. She introduces herself as Ivy Aguas, a billionaire, and penetrates the Ardiente family. In addition, Wildflower also chronicles Lily Cruz and Diego Torillo, childhood best friends whose love is intertwined with the Ardiente family. They try to love each other despite the chaos of the family.

Cast and characters

Main

Supporting

Recurring

Guest

Special guest

References

Wildflower (TV series)
Lists of Philippine television series characters
Lists of drama television characters
Lists of soap opera characters by series